Samantha Seager (born 13 July 1974) is a British actress born in Wigan, Greater Manchester, England, who played the role of Jodie Morton in the soap opera Coronation Street. Since leaving Coronation Street, Seager worked in television and theatre. She appeared in an episode of Little Britain where she was a background character .

Career

She played Cathy Rigby in one episode of The Bill (series 12, episode 149). She was in a one-off episode of the BBCs Waterloo Road in 2010, as Joeley Vale. She has played the role of Bobby the Bus Cleaner on the programme on CBeebies, Me Too!. She played Dawn in Invincible by Torben Betts in 2014, at Richmond's Orange Tree Theatre, which then transferred to the St James Theatre, London. Seager has two children, Johnny and Willow. Her partner is a barrister.

In 2020 she narrated Eat Well For Less, a food show on BBC One.

References

External links

English television actresses
English soap opera actresses
English stage actresses
People from Atherton, Greater Manchester
1974 births
Living people